Almaz Ayana Eba (born 21 November 1991) is an Ethiopian female long-distance runner. She won the gold medal in the 10,000 metres and bronze for the 5000 metres at the 2016 Rio Olympics. Almaz is a four-time World Athletics Championships medallist earning a bronze for the 5000m in 2013, gold at the event in 2015 as well as gold in the 10,000m and silver for the 5000m in 2017.

She broke the 10,000 metres world record, set in 1993, while winning the gold medal at the Rio Olympics and held it until 2021. At the 2017 World Championships in London, Almaz won the title in the 10,000m, finishing 46 seconds ahead of the runner-up. She places third in both the 5000m and 10,000m on the respective world all-time lists. In 2016, she was voted IAAF Female World Athlete of the Year.

Almaz set the fastest ever women's marathon debut at the 2022 Amsterdam Marathon.

Origin
Almaz Ayana was born in Wenbera, Benishangul-Gumuz Region, Ethiopia. Born the seventh youngest of nine siblings, she started running at local school at age 13–14. She is married to her childhood friend-and longtime partner, Soressa Fida. Like other notable athletes such as Fatuma Roba and Derartu Tulu, Almaz is also Oromo descent.
In addition to her native Oromo language, she also speaks Amharic. The name Almaz means Diamond in Amharic. Almaz is a devout Christian.

Career

5000 metres
Almaz won a bronze medal in the 5000 metres at the 2013 World Championships in Athletics in Moscow, Russia.

Almaz won her first senior 5000 metres title at the 2014 African Championships in Marrakech, defeating favourite Genzebe Dibaba in a championship record time of 15:32.72. One month later at the IAAF Continental Cup in Marrakech, she won the 5000 metres by over 24 seconds.

In May 2015, Almaz ran a personal best of 14:14.32 over 5000 metres at the IAAF Diamond League meeting in Shanghai, China, improving upon her previous personal best of 14:25.84 set in 2013 in Paris. This made her the third fastest female athlete over that distance, behind compatriots Tirunesh Dibaba, the world record holder, and Meseret Defar.

At the 2015 IAAF World Championships in Beijing, she won the 5000 metres, beating bronze medalist Genzebe Dibaba by more than 17 seconds.

On 2 June 2016, Almaz ran 5000 metres in 14:12.59 at the Golden Gala meeting in Rome. This made her the second fastest woman ever at this distance, behind only Tirunesh Dibaba's world record of 14:11.15.

10,000 metres
She ran the 10,000 metres competitively for the first time at the June 2016 Ethiopian Olympic trials in Hengelo, Netherlands. She posted the fastest ever debut time of 30:07 and defeated Tirunesh Dibaba.

At the 2016 Summer Olympics, she set a world record of 29:17.45 in the 10,000 metres, topping Chinese athlete Wang Junxia's 23-year-old world record by 14 seconds. No one previously had run within 22 seconds of Wang's record. The 10,000 metres was already an extremely fast race when Ayana broke away with 12 laps to go. Second-placed Vivian Cheruiyot of Kenya finished just a second shy of Wang's record and double Olympic 10,000 metres champion Tirunesh Dibaba earned the bronze medal with a 12 seconds improvement in her personal best and the fourth fastest time in history. Multiple national records were set, and eighteen competitors set personal bests. The lax drug testing regime in Ethiopia and the doping scandals that embroiled athletics before the Rio Olympics caused some to question whether Almaz had been doping. British commentators Brendan Foster and Paula Radcliffe, both former world record holders in distance events, were skeptical about Almaz's performance. Fellow competitors reported that before the race, the Ethiopian was coughing and did not seem well. In her post-race press conference, Ayana said her time was purely the outcome of hard training.

On 5 August 2017, she won the 10,000 metres at the World Championships in London with a world-leading 30:16.32, before adding a silver for the 5000 metres eight days later.

2018–2022: Injuries, motherhood and comeback
The Ethiopian distance running star took three years off due to injury problems and pregnancy. Almaz started competing again from April 2022.

On 16 October 2022, she made the fastest ever women's marathon debut of 2:17:20 at the Amsterdam Marathon to win the race and defeat her old-time rival Genzebe Dibaba by 45 seconds. Almaz set a course record by almost 40 seconds, Dutch all-comers' record (best performance on country's soil) and the seventh-best time in history.

Recognition
 2016 – IAAF Female World Athlete of the Year.

Achievements
Information from World Athletics profile unless otherwise noted.

International competitions

Personal bests

Circuit wins and titles, National titles
 Diamond League Overall winner 5000 m:  2016
 2015 (2): Shanghai Golden Grand Prix (5000m), Zürich Weltklasse (3000m)
 2016 (4): Qatar Athletic Super Grand Prix (3000m, WL), Rabat Meeting International Mohammed VI d'Athlétisme (5000m, WL MR), Rome Golden Gala - Pietro Mennea (5000m, WL DLR), Brussels Memorial Van Damme (5000m, MR)
 Ethiopian Athletics Championships
 5000 metres: 2014
 3000 metres steeplechase: 2013

References

External links
 
 
 
 
 

1991 births
Living people
Ethiopian female long-distance runners
Ethiopian female steeplechase runners
Sportspeople from Benishangul-Gumuz Region
World Athletics Championships athletes for Ethiopia
World Athletics Championships medalists
Athletes (track and field) at the 2016 Summer Olympics
Olympic athletes of Ethiopia
Olympic gold medalists for Ethiopia
Olympic bronze medalists for Ethiopia
Medalists at the 2016 Summer Olympics
Olympic gold medalists in athletics (track and field)
Olympic bronze medalists in athletics (track and field)
World Athletics record holders
Olympic female long-distance runners
World Athletics Championships winners
Diamond League winners
IAAF Continental Cup winners